1,2-Diiodoethylene, also known as 1,2-diiodoethene, is an organoiodide with the molecular formula CHI.  It can exist as either of two geometric isomers, cis-1,2-diiodoethylene or trans-1,2-diiodoethylene.

E-Z relative stability 
Like most cis-trans compounds, the Z isomer (cis) is less stable than the E isomer (trans) by 2 kcal/mol.

See also
 1,1-Diiodoethane
 1,2-Diiodoethane

References

Organoiodides
Haloalkenes
Halogenated solvents